The Wizard of Oz and Other Harold Arlen Songs is an album by American jazz trumpeter and arranger Shorty Rogers performing songs composed by Harold Arlen including several from The Wizard of Oz. The album was issued by RCA Victor  in 1959.

Reception

Allmusic awarded the album 4 stars calling it "Wonderful music".

Track listing 
All compositions by Harold Arlen and E. Y. "Yip" Harburg except where noted.
 "We're Off to See the Wizard" - 1:20
 "Over the Rainbow" - 3:01 	
 "The Jitterbug" - 3:17
 "The Merry Old Land of Oz" - 5:35
 "If I Only Had a Brain" - 3:28
 "Ding-Dong! The Witch Is Dead" - 3:31
 "My Shining Hour" - 3:36
 "Get Happy" (Arlen, Ted Koehler) - 2:44
 "Blues in the Night" (Arlen, Johnny Mercer) - 5:47
 "Let's Fall in Love" (Arlen, Koehler) - 3:17
 "That Old Black Magic" (Arlen, Mercer) - 5:25 
Recorded in Los Angeles, CA on February 3, 1959 (tracks 4, 5 & 7), February 5, 1959 (tracks 3, 6, 8 & 10) and February 10, 1959 (tracks 1, 2, 9 & 11)

Personnel 
Shorty Rogers - trumpet, flugelhorn, arranger
Pete Candoli, Buddy Childers, Don Fagerquist, Ollie Mitchell, Al Porcino, Ray Triscari - trumpet 
Harry Betts, Marshall Cram, Frank Rosolino - trombone
Bob Enevoldsen - valve trombone
Jimmy Giuffre - clarinet
Herb Geller - alto saxophone, tenor saxophone 
Bud Shank - alto saxophone
Bill Holman - tenor saxophone
Chuck Gentry - baritone saxophone
Larry Bunker - vibraphone
Barney Kessel - guitar
Pete Jolly - piano
Joe Mondragon - bass 
Mel Lewis - drums

References 

Shorty Rogers albums
1959 albums
RCA Records albums
Harold Arlen tribute albums
Albums arranged by Shorty Rogers